Diego Rafael Perrone Vienes (born 17 November 1979 in Montevideo) is a retired Uruguayan footballer who played as a striker. He is the goalscorer leader of Danubio in all its history with 72 goals.

Career
Perrone began his career playing with his home team Danubio F.C., making his debut in 1996. He has gone through many clubs around the world including Atlas and León in Mexico, Lugano in Switzerland, Catania in Italy, Levadiakos in Greece, and finally Olimpia Asunción in Paraguay.

He is recognized (especially by the Danubio supporters) for scoring the goal via "taco" on the Final of the 2004 Uruguayan Primera División were Danubio was consecrated champion after winning Nacional 1-0 that afternoon at the Jardines Del Hipódromo.

Goalscoring record
On 4 December 2011, thanks to the last of the three goals scored against Bella Vista, Perrone reached Ruben "Polillita" da Silva as top scorer in the history of the Danubio. The next game, played on February 18, 2012 (first round of Clausura) he scored in the 1-1 draw with Wanderers, adding its 72 goal in the club, and establishing himself as the leading scorer of Danubio F.C. in all its history.

Honours
Danubio
Uruguayan Primera División: 2004

Nacional
Liguilla: 2008

References

External links

Profile at tenfieldigital

Uruguayan footballers
Uruguay international footballers
Danubio F.C. players
Atlas F.C. footballers
FC Lugano players
Catania S.S.D. players
Levadiakos F.C. players
Club Nacional de Football players
Club Olimpia footballers
Central Español players
Uruguayan Primera División players
Liga MX players
Serie B players
Swiss Challenge League players
Paraguayan Primera División players
Uruguayan expatriate footballers
Expatriate footballers in Paraguay
Expatriate footballers in Mexico
Expatriate footballers in Italy
Expatriate footballers in Greece
Expatriate footballers in Switzerland
Association football forwards
Footballers from Montevideo
Uruguayan people of Italian descent
1979 births
Living people